The Jewel Box is a pasticcio opera constructed by Paul Griffiths out of various pieces by Wolfgang Amadeus Mozart. Its mostly English libretto by Paul Griffiths includes new translations of most of the Italian-language texts of the musical numbers. It was premiered by Opera North at the Theatre Royal, Nottingham, on 19 February 1991. The conductor was Elgar Howarth, the director was Francisco Negrin and the designer was Anthony Baker.

Background

Griffiths, realising that arias composed by Mozart for insertion in other composers' operas are seldom performed nowadays, worked up what he called "a jeu d'esprit" which also contained music from the composer's unfinished operas Lo sposo deluso and L'oca del Cairo and some of the arias which he had written for concert performances. This came to the attention of Nicholas Payne, General Director of Opera North, who scheduled its première for 1991, the year of the bicentenary of Mozart's death.

Performance history

After the Nottingham premiere and subsequent performances in Opera North's territory of northern England, the opera was performed in the United States by Skylight Opera Theatre (1993), Wolf Trap Opera (1994), Chicago Opera Theater (1996), and New Jersey State Opera (1996). In England, it was revived by Bampton Classical Opera in 2006 for the 250th anniversary of Mozart's birth, with the orchestra conducted by Edward Gardner.

Roles

Synopsis

Four characters from the commedia dell'arte (Dottore, Pantalone, Colombina and Pedrolino) open the opera with a quartet. There is no more music, so the Dottore summons the Composer, who, with the aid of a singer of tragic music and his own father, gradually works out how the opera should go. The opera ends with an epilogue sung by the Composer.

Musical numbers

Act 1

Act 2

References

English-language operas
Operas
1991 operas
Works based on operas by Wolfgang Amadeus Mozart